This is a list of various Ragas in Hindustani classical music. There is no exact count/known number of ragas which are there in Indian classical music. 

Once Ustad Vilayat Khan saheb at the Sawai Gandharva Bhimsen Festival, Pune said before beginning his performance - "There are approximately about 4 lakh raags in Hindustani Classical music. Many of them are repetitious but have different names."

Here some of the Raags and other types that are named alphabetically. (Following are Raags, Raaginis, Upraags, Putra raags, raag's wives, Das raags, Dasi raags, Misra raags or Jod raags, etc all are present in the following list in an alphabetical order) :

A
 Aadi (raga)
 Aadi Basant (Marwa Thaat)
 Aarabi (raga)
 Abhari (raagini)
 Abheri Todi
 Abhiri (raagini)
 Abhogi
 Abhogi Kanada
 Achob (raga)
 Adambari Kedar (raga)
 Adana (raga)
 Adana Bahar
 Adana Malhar
 Adbhut Kalyan (raga)
 Adbhut Ranjani
 Aghali (raga)
 Ahir Bhairav
 Ahimohini (raagini)
 Ahir Kanada
 Ahir Lalat
 Ahir Lalit
 Ahiri (raagini)
 Ahiri Malhar
 Ahiri Todi
 Ajad (raga)
 Ajad Hindol
 Alamgiri (raagini)
 Amba Manohari
 Ambika Sarang
 Amari (raagini)
 Amiri Kauns (Vachaspati aang) 
 Amir Khani Kauns (Vachaspati aang)
 Amrith Kalyan
 Amritvarshini (raga)
 Ananda (raga's son)
 Ananda Bhairav
 Ananda Leela 
 Ananda Malhar
 Anandi (raagini)
 Anandi Bahar 
 Anandi kedar
 Andhri (raga) 
 Andiyali (raagini)
 Anjani Kalyan
 Anjani Todi
 Anuranjani
 Alhaiya
 Alhaiya Bilaval
 Araj (raga)
 Arun Malhar
 Asa (raga)
 Asa Bhairav
 Asa Kafi 
 Asa Maand
 Asa Todi
 Asa Asavari 
 Asavari (Shuddh Rishabh Asavari)
 Asavari Todi (Komal Rishabh Asavari)
 Aslekhi (raagini)
 Averi Bhairavi
 Audav (raga)
 Audav Bhairav 
 Audav Bilawal
 Audav Devgiri (raagini)
 Audav Dhannasri (raagini)
 Audav Gandhar 
 Audav Girija 
 Audav Kauns
 Audav Shuddha Kalyan

B
 Badhans (raga)
 Badhamsa Sarang (Badhans Sarang) 
 Bagkauns (raga)
 Bageshri / Bageshree 
 Bageshri Bahar
 Bageshri Kanada
 Bageshri Kauns 
 Bahaduri Todi
 Bahar
 Bahari Kedar
 Bairagi
 Bairagi Bhairav 
 Bairagi Todi
 Bakul Bhairav
 Bakulabharan (raga)
 Ban (putra raga)
 Bangal (putra raga)
 Bangal Bhairav
 Bangal Bilawal
 Bangli (raagini)
 Barari (Marwa aang)
 Barari (Purvi aang)
 Barathi Todi
 Barhams Sarang
 Barahansika (raagini)
 Barwa (raga)
 Basant 
 Basant Bahar
 Basant Pancham
 Basant Hindol
 Basant Kedar 
 Basanta Mukhari
 Basanti (raagini)
 Basanti Kanada
 Basanti Kauns
 Basanti Kedar
 Bayati
 Bhairav
 Beehad (raga)
 Beehad Bhairav
 Bhairav Bahar
 Bhairav Bhatiyar
 Bhairavi
 Bhankhar
 Bhankhari
 Bhaskali
 Bhasker (putra raga)
 Bhatiyar (Marwa aang)
 Bhatiyar (Purvi aang)
 Bhatiyari (raagini)
 Bhatiyari Bhairav
 Bhatiyari Gauri 
 Bhavmat (raga)
 Bhavmat Bhairav
 Bhav Kauns
 Bhavsakh
 Bhavsakh Kanada 
 Bhavana pancham (upraga)
 Bhawani (raga)
 Bhawani Bahar
 Bhilalu
 Bhim (Kafi Thaat)
 Bhimsen
 Bhimpalasi
 Bhinna Bhairav
 Bhinna Kauns
 Bhinna Lalat
 Bhinna Rageshri
 Bhinna Shadja
 Bhookosh (raga)
 Bhora (putra raga)
 Bhup/Bhoopali
 Bhoopal (bhairav Thaat)
 Bhoopal Todi
 Bhoopeshwari
 Bhup Bilawal
 Bhup Kalyan 
 Bhup Nat
 Bhupawali
 Bhupkali
 Bhuplai
 Bibhas (Marwa aang)
 Bibhas (Purvi aang)
 Bibhas (Bhairav aang)
 Bibhas (Deshkar aang)
 Bibhas Parbhati 
 Bihag
 Bihag Maalva
 Bihag Nat 
 Bihag Pat 
 Bihag Savani
 Bihagada (with N)
 Bihagada (with n, N)
 Bihagara 
 Bihari 
 Bihagora (raga)
 Bihagora Maalva (raga)
 Bihari (raga)
 Bilaskhani Todi
 Bilawal 
 Bilawal Dakhani
 Bilawal Gond  
 Bilawal Kukubh 
 Bilawal Malhar (mixture of ragas Gaud Malhar and Alhaiya Bilawal)
 Bilawal Nat
 Bilawal Shukla
 Bilawali (raagini)
 Bilahari (raga)
 Binoda (putra raga)
 Biradhar (putra raga)
 Birju ki Malhar
 Brindabani Sarang

C
 Chaiti (raga)
 Chaiti Barwa
 Chaiti Bhup
 Chakradhar (raga)
 Chakravaak (raga)
 Chalnat
 Champak bilawal
 Champak (putra raga)
 Champakali
 Chand (putra raga)
 Chanchalsas Malhar
 Chandani (raga)
 Chandani Bihag
 Chandani Kalyan
 Chandani Kedar
 Chandra Bhairav
 Chandra Bhankar
 Chandra-Bimb (putra raga)
 Chandra Kalyan 
 Chandradhwani 
 Chandrakant (raga)
 Chandrakauns (Agra Gharana)
 Chandrakauns (Bageshree aang)
 Chandrakauns
 Chandramouli
 Chandranandan
 Chandraprabha
 Chandrika (raga)
 Charju ki Malhar
 Charukauns
 Charukeshi
 Chhaya (raga)
 Chhaya bihag
 Chhaya Gaud Sarang
 Chhaya Hindol
 Chhaya Kalyan
 Chhaya Malhar 
 Chhaya Tilak
 Chhayanat

D
 Dadori 
 Dagori
 Dakshina Gujjari (raga)
 Dakshinatya (raga)
 Daras Kauns (raga)
 Darbari
 Darbari Kanada
 Darbari Todi 
 Daulati (raagini)
 Dayabati
 Deepak (Bilawal Thaat)
 Deepak Kedar
 Deepawali
 Deepranjani
 Deosakh
 Deogandhara (raga's son)
 Desaa Jaldhar (raga)
 Desaa Sawan (raga)
 Desaa Sorath (raga)
 Desh
 Desh Gaud 
 Desh Jogi 
 Desh Malhar 
 Deshakhya (raga)
 Deshi (raagini)
 Desi Devgiri 
 Deshi Tilang
 Desi Todi
 Deshkar (Purvi aang)
 Deshkar (Marwa aang)
 Deshkar
 Devadarshini 
 Devangi
 Devkari (raagini)
 Dev Gandhar (raga) (Both Ga's in Jaunpuri)
 Dev Gandhar (Jogia aang)
 Dev Gandhar (Asavari aang)
 Devgaandhari (raagini)
 Devaranjani
 Devata Bhairav
 Devgiri Bilawal
 Devmaya
 Devkauns
 Devsag (raga)
 Devtirthi 
 Dev Todi
 Dhakka (raga) (Komal Bhimpalasi)
 Dharmavati
 Dhan Basanti (Purvi aang)
 Dhanakoni Kalyan
 Dhanashri (raga)
 Dhanashri (Bhairavi aang)
 Dhanashri (Bilawal aang)
 Dhanashri (Kafi aang)
 Dhanashri (Khamaj aang)
 Dhanashri Multani
 Dhanawarchi Kalyan
 Dhani
 Dhanki
 Dhanikauns
 Dhanya Dhaivat
 Dhavalshree (raga)
 Dhulia Malhar
 Dhulia Sarang
 Dhumavati
 Din Ka Malkauns 
 Divyagandhar
 Din ka Shankara
 Din ki Puriya (raagini)
 Din ki Puriya (Poorvi aang)
 Dishakh (putra raag)
 Divya Chandrika (created by Pt. Milind Date)
 Diwali (raagini)
 Dravida Gauda (raga)
 Dravida Gujjari (raga)
 Durga (raga)
 Durga (Bilawal Thaat)
 Durga (Khamaj Thaat) 
 Durga Kalyan 
 Durga Kedar
 Durgawati (raagini)
 Durgeshwari 1
 Durgeshwari 2
 Dwijavanthi

E
 Enayatkhani Kanada
 Erukalakambhoji (raga)

G
 Gagan Vihang (raga)
 Gajdhar (putra raga) 
 Gambhir (raga)
 Gandhara (putra raga)
 Gandhari 1 (raagini)
 Gandhari 2 (raagini)
 Gandhari 3 (raagini)
 Gandhari Bahar 
 Gandhakriya (raga)
 Gandhi Malhar
 Ganeshwari (raga)
 Gara (raga)
 Gara Bageshri
 Gara Kanada
 Gara Mand 
 Gaud (raga)
 Gaud Bahar
 Gaud Bilawal
 Gaud Malhar
 Gaud Sarang
 Gaudgiri Bahar
 Gaudi (putra raga) 
 Gaudi Bahar 
 Gaudi Lalat
 Gaudi Malari (putra raga)
 Gaul (Bhairav Thaat) 
 Gauri (raga)
 Gauri (Bhairav Thaat)
 Gauri (Kalingada aang) (2 Ma’s)
 Gauri (Marwa aang)
 Gauri (Poorvi aang)
 Gauri Bairagan 
 Gauri Basant
 Gauri Chayti
 Gauri Cheti 
 Gauri Dakhani
 Gauri Deepaki
 Gauri Guarairi
 Gauri Lalita
 Gauri Majh 
 Gauri Mala
 Gauri Malva
 Gauri Purbi
 Gauri Purbi Deepaki 
 Gauri Sorath 
 Gaundkari (raagini)
 Gawati (raga)
 Girija Audav 
 Girija Bhairav 
 Girija Gandhar 
 Girija Kauns 
 Godagir (raagini)
 Gop Kamboji (Kafi Thaat)
 Gopika (raga)
 Gopika Basant
 Gorakh Kalyan
 Govardhani Todi
 Gound 
 Gujjari (raagini)
 Guna Kalyan
 Guna Sagra
 Gunkiri (raagini)
 Gunguni (putra raga)
 Gunakali (raga)
 Gunakali (Bilawal Thaat)
 Gunakali (without Ma)
 Gunakali (without Ni)
 Gunakali Jogia
 Gunakali Utari (raga)
 Gunakree
 Gunaranjani
 Gund (putra raga)
 Gunji Kanada
 Gunjikauns
 Gurjri (raagini)
 Gurjari Todi
 Guru Kalyan
 Gyankali

H
 Hameer
 Hameer Tarang
 Hameer Bahar
 Hameer Bilawal 
 Hameer Kalyan
 Hameer Kedar
 Hameeri (raagini)
 Hameeri Bilawal
 Hamviri (raagini)
 Hamsadhvani
 Hamsa Kalyan
 Himala (raga's son)
 Hansanarayani (Purvi Thaat)
 Hanskinkini (raga)
 Haunsnad (raga)
 Hansvinod (raga)
 Harakh (putra raga)
 Harsha (raga's son)
 Harshsrungara
 Harasringara (raagini)
 Hari Bhairav (a raga created and tributed by Pt. Milind Date to his Guru Pandit Hariprasad Chaurasia)
 Hari Kauns (raga)
 Hari Mohini (a raga created and tributed by Pt. Milind Date to his Guru Pandit Hariprasad Chaurasia)
 Hari Priya (raga)
 Hasantrehta (raga)
 Hem Bihag
 Hem Kalyan
 Hem Lalat
 Hem Nat
 Hemshri (created by Pt. Acharya Vishwanath Rao Ringe 'Tanarang')
 Hemant (raga)
 Hemvati (raga)
 Hemvanti (raga)
 Hijaj (raga)
 Hijaj Bhairav
 Hindol
 Hindol Ajad (raga)
 Hindol Bahar
 Hindol Basant
 Hindol Hem
 Hindol Kalyan
 Hindol Marg (raga)
 Hindol Pancham (raga)
 Hindoli (raagini)
 Hindolita (raagini)
 Homshikha (raga) (Khamaj Thaat)
 Hussaini Kanada 1
 Hussaini Kanada 2
 Hussaini Kanada 2
 Hussani Bhairav (a raga created and tributed by Pt. Milind Date to Ustad Zakir Hussain)
 Hussaini Bhairavi
 Hussani Todi

I
 Iman (raga's son)
 Imratkauns
 Inayatkhani Kanada (created by Ustad Vilayat Khan)
 Indumati
 Indrasan

J
 Jablidhar (putra raga)
 JaiKauns (raga)
 JaiRaj (Bilawal Thaat)
 Jaij Bilawal
 Jaimini (raga)
 Jaimini Kalyan 
 Jait (Marwa Thaat)
 Jaitshri (raagini)
 Jait Kalyan
 Jaiwanti (Todi Thaat)
 Jaijaiwanti
 Jaijaiwanti (Kafi aang) 
 Jaijaiwanti (Desh aang)
 Jaijaiwanti Kanada
 Jaijaiwanti Todi
 Jaldhara (putra raga)
 Jaladhar Basanti
 Jaladhar Desa
 Jaladhar Kedar
 Janasammohini
 Jangla Purvi
 Jangula (Asavari aang)
 Jaun (raga)
 Jaunkali
 Jaunpuri
 Jaunpuri Bahar
 Jaunpuri Todi
 Jayant (Kafi Thaat)
 Jayant Malhar (it is made up of ragas Jaijaiwanti and Malhar.)
 Jayant Kanada (it is made up of ragas Jaijaiwanti and Kanada.)
 Jayanti (raagini) 
 Jaya
 Jayet
 Jetashree
 Jhanjh Malhar
 Jhinjhoti
 Jhinjhoti Misravanti
 Jhilla/Jilla (raga)
 Jog (raga)
 Jog Bahar 
 Jog Tilang
 Jogeshwari (raga) (Kafi Thaat)
 Jogeshwari (raga) (Khamaj Thaat)
 Jogi (raga)
 Jogi Bhairavi
 Jogi Mand
 Jogia Kalingada
 Jogia
 Jogiya Asavari
 Jogkauns
 Jogwanti
 Joun Bhairav
 Jungala (raga)

K 
 Kaamaai (Khamaj Thaat)
 Kaamkesh (Khamaj Thaat)
 Kabir Bhairav 1
 Kabir Bhairav 2
 Kabiri (raagini)
 Kabiri Gauri 
 Kachheli (raagini)
 Kafi
 Kafi Bahar
 Kafi Kanada
 Kafi Malhar
 Kagnat (raga)
 Kaisiki (raagini)
 Kakambheri (Bhairavi)
 Kakubha (raagini)
 Kala Bharan (Khamaj Thaat)
 Kalahans (raga)
 Kaalanka (putra raga)
 Kalaranjani
 Kalashree (created by Pt Bhimsen Joshi)
 Kalian (raga)
 Kalian Bhopali
 Kalinga (raga)
 Kalingada
 Kalyan
 Kalyani (raagini)
 Kamakshani (raagini)
 Kamal (putra raga)
 Kamal Shree
 Kamalaranjani
 Kamboji (raga)
 Kameshwari
 Kamkesh (raga)
 Kamod
 Kamod Nat
 Kamodi (raagini)
 Kamodwanti (raagini) (Khamaj Thaat)
 Kampili (raagini)
 Kanada (raga)
 Kanada Bageshri
 Kanada Bahar
 Kaanara (raga)
 Kannadi (raagini)
 Kanaraya (raga's son)
 Kanakanagi (raga)
 Kanmala (raga's son)
 Kanra 
 Kanakanagi (Bhairav Thaat)
 Kausi 
 Kausi Kanada (Bageshri aang)
 Kausi Kanada (Nayaki aang)
 Kansi Kanada (it is a mixture of ragas Malkauns and Kanada)
 Kapar Gauri
 Kapi (raga) (Kafi Thaat)
 Karnati (raagini)
 Karnataka Bangala
 Karnataki (raagini)
 Kaushik (raga)
 Kaushikdwani (raga)
 Kaushiki (raagini)
 Kaushi Kanada 
 Kaunsi Kanada (Nayaki aang)
 Kaunsi (Bhairavi Thaat)
 Kedar
 Kedar Bahar
 Kedar Bhairav
 Kedar Bhankar
 Kedar Mand
 Kedar Nand
 KedarNanda 
 Kedari (raagini)
 Kedari Malhar 
 Keki (raagini)
 Kesari Kalyan
 Khamaj 
 Khamaj Bahar
 Khambavati (Khamaj Thaat)
 Khammaji Bhatiyar
 Khapar Gauri 
 Khat (Asavari Thaat)
 Khat 
 Khat Dhanashree
 Khat Todi
 Khem (raga) (Kalyan Thaat)
 Khem Kalyan
 Khemb (raga)
 Khemdhwan (raga)
 Khemnat (raga)
 Khokar
 Khokat (putra raga)
 Kiranranjani (raagini)
 Kiwani 
 Klawanti
 Kohari Kalyan 
 Kokabh (raga)
 Kokar (raag's son)
 Kokila Pancham (upraga)
 Kohal (raga) (Kafi Thaat)
 Kolahal (raga) (Bilawal Thaat)
 Kolhaas (raga) (Kafi Thaat)
 Komal Bageshri
 Komal Bhairav 
 Komal Desi 
 Komal Rishabh Asavari (raga)
 Kola (raga's son)
 Koumari (raagini) (Poorvi Thaat)
 Kripavati (raagini) (Asavari Thaat)
 Krishna Kalyan (raga)
 Krulanda (raga's son)
 Kukubh (raga)
 Kumbh (putra raga)
 Kumbhara (raga's son)
 Kumodini (raagini)
 Kunada (raga)
 Kuntal (putra raga)
 Kuranji (raga)
 Kusha (raga's son)
 Kusum (putra raga)

L
 Lachari Kanada
 Lachari Todi
 Lachchasakh (raga)
 Lachhasas (raga)
 Lagan Gandhar
 Lajwanti (raagini)
 Lakshmi Kalyan 
 Lakshmi Todi
 Lalat
 Lalat Bahar
 Lalat Pancham
 Lalit (putra raga)
 Lalit Bhatiyar
 Lalit Bilas
 Lalit Pancham
 Lalita (raagini)
 Lalita Gauri (Bhairav aang)
 Lalita Gauri (Poorvi aang)
 Lalita Sohani
 Lalitdhwani
 Lalitkali
 Lataangi (raga)
 Lankadahan Sarang (also known as Lankadahani Sarang)
 Lankeshri 1
 Lankeshri 2
 Lankeshri Kanada
 Lankeshwari
 Lom

M
 Madha Kalyan
 Madhakauns
 Madhava (putra raga)
 Madhasuraja (raga)
 Madhu (putra raga)
 Madhu Basant
 Madhukali 
 Madhu Kalyan
 Madhu Malhar
 Madhu Malvi
 Madhu Sarang
 Madhu Saraswati
 Madhuwanti 
 Madhukauns
 Madhumadh Sarang
 Madhumalati
 Madhumadhavi (raagini)
 Madhuranjani
 Madhusurawali
 Madhyamad Sarang
 Madhyamavati 
 Mahathi 
 Maharashtra Gujjari (raga)
 Majh (raga) 
 Malashree
 Malavasri (raagini)
 Malani (Bhairavi Thaat)
 Malati Basant
 Malati Bihag
 Malati
 Malava
 Malavi (Marwa Thaat)
 Malavi (Purvi Thaat)
 Malawa  Bihag
 Malawati
 Malayalam
 Malhar
 Malhari (raagini)
 Malgunji
 Maligaura (d)
 Maligaura (d, D)
 Malini Basant
 Malkauns
 Malkauns Bahar
 Malkauns Kanada 
 Malkauns Pancham
 Maalva (raga)
 Malavi (raagini)
 Maluha Bihag
 Maluha Kalyan
 Maluha Kedar
 Maluha Mand
 Mallari (raagini)
 Manavi
 Mand Bhairav
 Mand Bhatiyar
 Mand
 Mangal Bhairav 1
 Mangal Bhairav 2
 Mangal Lalit
 Mangal Todi
 Mangaldhwani
 Mangalgujari
 Mangalan (putra raga)
 Mangeshi Todi (a raga created and tributed to Lata Mangeshkar, Asha Bhosale and Family by Pt. Milind Date)
 Mangiya Bhusani
 Manj Khamaj
 Manjha Khamaj
 Manjari 
 Manjari Bihag
 Manjubhashini 
 Marga Bihag
 Marg Hindol 
 Maru (putra raga)
 Maru Basant
 Maru Bihag
 Maru Dakhani 
 Maru Kalyan
 Maru Kafi 
 Maru Kauns 
 Maru Khamaj
 Maru Sarang
 Marwa
 Marwa Shree
 Medhavi
 Meghranji
 Mehkali
 Mewara (putra raga)
 Mayuri (raagini)
 Mirabai ki Malhar
 Mishra Bhairavi 
 Mishra Bihag 
 Mishra Desh 
 Mishra Gara 
 Mishra Jhinjhoti
 Mishra Jog 
 Mishra Kafi
 Mishra Kalyan 
 Mishra Khamaj
 Mishra Kirwani 
 Mishra Mand 
 Mishra Manjha
 Mishra Narayani
 Mishra Nat 
 Mishra Pahadi 
 Mishra Pilu
 Mishra Shankara 
 Mishra Shivaranjani 
 Mishra Todi
 Malhar (Some consider raga Malhar different from raga Miyan Malhar)
 Miyan Malhar
 Miyan ki Sarang (made up by the mixer of ragas Miyan Malhar and Brindabani Sarang)
 Miyan ki Todi
 Mod Malhar (made up by the mixer of ragas Kamod and Miyan Malhar)
 Mohankauns
 Mohini
 Motaki
 MotakiTodi
 Mrig Savani
 Mudrika Kanada
 Mudriki Kanada (raagini)
 Mugdha Chandrika (raga created by Pt. Milind Date)
 Mukthipradayini
 Multani
 Multani dhanashree
 Mustang (putra raga)

N
 Nad (putra raga)
 Nada Kalyan
 Nadanamakriya (raga)
 Nagadhwani Kanada 
 Naga Gandhar (upraga)
 Naga Pancham (upraga)
 Nagaswaravali
 Naiki Kanada 
 Nanad
 Nand
 Nand Basant
 Nand Kauns
 Nand Kedar 
 Nanak Malhar
 Narayani
 Narendra Kaunsa (a raga tributed to Shri Narendra Modi and created by Pt. Milind Date)
 Nat (putra raga)
 Nat Bhairav
 Nat Bihag
 Nat Bilawal
 Nat Kamod
 Nat Kedar
 Nat Malhar 
 Nat Nagari
 Natachandra
 Natahams
 Natakpriya
 Natika (raagini)
 Natnarayan 
 Natnarayani 1
 Natnarayani 2
 Nathmira (raagini)
 Narayani (raga)
 NavRanjani 
 Nayaki Kanada
 Nepala (raga)
 Nepala Gauda (raga)
 Neelambari
 Nindiyari
 Niranjani Todi

P
 Pahadi (raga)
 Palas (raga)
 Palas Kafi
 Palasi
 Pancha Jogeshwari 
 Pancham (putra raga)
 Pancham (Basant aang)
 Pancham (Hindol aang)
 Pancham Malkauns
 Pancham Shadhav (upraga)
 Pancham se Gara
 Parbal (putra raga)
 Parbhati 
 Parbhati Bibhas 
 Parbhati Dakhani 
 Paraj (putra raga)
 Paraj Basant
 Paraj Kalingada
 Paraji Bhairav 
 Parameshwari (raga)
 Pardesh (raga)
 Pat Bihag
 Pat Kafi
 Pat Ranjani
 Patdeepak
 Patmanjari (raagini) (earlier called as Phalamanjari or Padamanjari)
 Patmanjari 2
 Patmanjari 3 (Talwandi Gharana)
 Patdeep
 Phulashree
 Piloo
 Piloo Gara
 Piloo Ki Maanjh
 Pitambara
 Poorbya
 Prabhakali
 Prabhat (raga)
 Prabhat Bhairav
 Prabhati (raagini)
 Prabhateshwari
 Pradeepaki
 Pratapvarali
 Priya Kalyan
 Punyaki (raagini)
 Purabi Kalyan
 Purna Chandrakauns 
 Purva (Purvi Thaat)
 Purva Kalyan (Marwa Thaat)
 Purvi Bihag
 Puriya Dhanashree
 Puriya Kalyan 
 Pushpa Chandrika (created by Pt. Pannalal Ghosh)

R
 Rageshri
 Rageshri Bahar
 Rageshri Kanada
 Rageshri Kauns
 Rageswari 
 Rahi (raga)
 Raisa Kanada 
 Raj Kalyan (raga)
 Raja Kalyan (raga)
 Rajani Kalyan (raga)
 Rama putra raga)
 Ram Gauri
 Ram Kalyan
 Ramanandi Gauri 
 Ramkali
 Ramkali Dakhani
 Ramdasi Malhar
 Ramsakh
 Ramakiri (raagini)
 Rangeshwari
 Rasia (raga)
 Rasia Kanada
 Rasranjani Rasavati
 Rati (raga)
 Rati Bhairav
 Rativallabha (raga)
 Rayasa Kanada
 Revagupta (upraga)
 Rewa (Purvi aang)
 Rudhravati
 Rudra Pancham
 Rudra Ranjani
 Rupawati Kalyan
 Rupkali
 Rupmanjari Malhar

S
 Sagara 
 Sagera
 Sagra (putra raga) 
 Sagunaranjani (raga)
 Sahanki (raagini)
 Saheli todi
 Saindhava (raga's son)
 Saindhavi (raagini)
 Sajan (raga)
 Salagvarali
 Salu (putra raga)
 Samant Kalyan 
 Samant Sarang
 Sampurna Bageshri
 Sampurna Bangala (raga's son)
 Sampurna Basakta (raga's son)
 Sampurna Bhairavi (raagini)
 Sampurna Bibhas 
 Sampurna Gauda (raga's son)
 Sampurna Hindol
 Sampurna Kedar
 Sampurna Malkauns
 Sampurna Sarang 
 Sampurna Ramkali (raagini)
 Sandhya 
 Sandhya Shree
 Sanjani
 Sanjh Barari
 Sanjh Sarawali
 Sanjh Tarini
 Sanjh
 Sangam Kedar 
 Santuri Todi
 Sar Nat
 Sarag (putra raga)
 Sarpada
 Sarang
 Sarang Kauns
 Sarangi (raagini)
 Saradi (putra raga)
 Sarasaangi (raga)
 Saraswati
 Saraswati Chandra
 Saraswati Kalyan
 Saraswati Kedar 
 Saraswati Sarang 
 Saravali (created by Ustad Vilayat Khan)
 Sarparda (raga)
 Sarparda Bilawal
 Salang 
 Salang Sarang
 Sathanka (raga's son)
 Saurati (raagini)
 Savan (raga)
 Savan Desaa (raga)
 Savani 1
 Savani 2
 Savani Barwa
 Savani Bhatiyar
 Savani Bihag
 Savani Bilawal
 Savani Kalyan
 Savani Kedar
 Savani Nat
 Saveri (raagini)
 Saveri Todi
 Sazgiri
 Sehra (by Ustad Sultan Khan)
 Seehute (raagini)
 Shajda (raga)
 Shadjandhri (raga)
 Shahana
 Shahana Bahar
 Shahana Kanada 
 Shaktilak (upraga)
 Shamvati
 Shankara
 Shankara Bihag
 Shankara Kalyan
 Sharada
 Shiv (raga)
 Shiv Abhogi
 Shiv Bhairav 
 Shivdhaam
 Shiv Kalyan (made up by the mixer of ragas Shivaranjani and Aman)
 Shiv Kauns
 Shiv Kedar 
 Shivari (raagini)
 Shivmat Bhairav
 Shivaranjani
 Shiv Todi
 Shobhavari
 Shree
 Shree Kalyan 1
 Shree Kalyan 2
 Shreetanki
 Shubh Kalyan 
 Shuddha (raga)
 Shuddha Bahar
 Shuddha Barari
 Shuddha Basant
 Shuddha Bhairavi
 Shuddha Bihag
 Shuddha Bilawal 
 Shuddha Dhanashree
 Shuddha Desi 
 Shuddha Kafi
 Shuddha Kalyan
 Shuddha Kedar
 Shuddha Lalat
 Shuddha Malhar (Bilawal Thaat)
 Shuddha Malu
 Shuddha Nat
 Shuddha Nishad Bageshri 
 Shuddha Sarang
 Shuddha Sarangi 
 Shuddha Shyam
 Shuddha Todi 
 Shukla (raga)
 Shukla Bilawal
 Shyam (putra raga)
 Shyam Kalyan 1
 Shyam Kalyan 2
 Shyam Kalyan
 Shyam Kauns
 Shyam Kedar
 Shyam Sarang
 Shyam Shree
 Simhendramadhyam
 Sindh (raga)
 Sindhimallari (raga)
 Sindhavi Asavari (raagini)
 Sindhava 
 Sindhu Bahar 
 Sindhu Bhairav
 Sindhu Bhairavi
 Sindhura
 Sindhura Bahar
 Sindhura Kafi
 Sindhuri (raagini)
 Sohani 
 Sohani Bhatiyar
 Sohani Pancham
 Soma (raga)
 Sooha (raga)
 Sorati (raagini) 
 Sorath
 Sorath Desaa (raga)
 Sorath Malhar
 Sorathi (raga's son's wife)
 Sourashtra (raga)
 Sourashtra Bhairav
 Sourashtra Gujjari 
 Siri Raag 
 Srirangapriya
 Subah Ki Malavi (Marwa Thaat) 
 Sugandh (raga)
 Sugharai
 Sugharai Kanada 
 Suha (raga)
 Suha Adana
 Suha Kanada
 Suha Malhar
 Suha Sughrai
 Suha Sugharai Kanada (raga)
 Suha Todi
 Suhi (raga)
 Suhi Kafi 
 Suhi lalit
 Suho/Suhai 
 Sujani Malhar
 Sukhiya (raga)
 Sukhiya Bilawal
 Sukul Bilawal
 Sunand Bhairav (created by Pt. Milind Date)
 Sunand Sarang (created by Pt. Milind Date)
 Sundar Kali (raga)
 Sundar Kauns (raga)
 Sur Malhar
 Surdasi Malhar 
 Suryakant (raga)
 Surya Kauns (raga)
 Surmanand (putra raga)
 Swanandi (raagini)
 Swarparda (raga)

T
 Takkasaindhav (upraga)
 Tanka (raagini)
 Tanseni Madhuwanti
 Tappa Khamaj 
 Telangi (raagini)
 Telugu Kambhoji (raga)
 Thumari (raga)
 Thyagaraja Mangalam
 Tilak Bihag
 Tilak Des
 Tilak Kamod
 Tilak Kedar
 Tilak Malhar 
 Tilak Shyam
 Tirbhukti
 Tilang
 Tilang Bahar 
 Tilang Kafi 
 Timbanki
 Tivrakallyan 
 Todi
 Todi Abheri 
 Todi Ahiri 
 Todika (raagini)
 Triveni
 Triveni Gauri
 Tukhari
 Tulsikauns (raa)
 Turushka Gauda (raga)
 Turushka Todi (raga)

U
 Udan (raga)
 Udan Chandrika (Kafi Thaat) 
 Udan Kanta (Khamaj Thaat)
 Udasi (raga)
 Udasi Bhairav (Bhairav Thaat)
 Uday (raga)
 Uday Chandrika (Asavari Thaat) (created by Pt. Milind Date)
 Uday Ravi (Bilawal Thaat)
 Uma Tilak (Khamaj Thaat)
 Ushhaak (raga made from shades of 3 ragas Sarang, Asavari and Bhairav)
 Utara Kalyan (raga)
 Utari (raga)
 Utari Basant 
 Utari Gunakali

V
 Vachspati 
 Vada Hamsa (raga's son's wife)
 Vadhans
 Vadhans Dakhani 
 Vanka (raagini)
 Varati (raagini)
 Vardhani 
 Varorji
 Vasanta 
 Vasanta Carnatic
 Vasanta Mukhari 
 Vasanti (raagini)
 Vaya (dasi raagini)  
 Velaval (raga's son)
 Velavali (raagini)
 Vibhas
 Vibhavari
 Vibhasaka 
 Vidhyavati
 Vihang
 Vigiswari (dasi raagini)
 Vijayaranjani
 Vikram Bhairav
 Vilolika (raagini)
 Vinod
 Virat Bhairav
 Virari (raagini) 
 Viyogvarali
 Vrindavani Sarang (it is also called as Brindabani Sarang.)
 Vyjayanti (raagini)

Y
 Yaman
 Yaman Kalyan
 Yamani (raagini)
 Yamani Basant
 Yamani Bilawal
 Yamani Hindol

Z
 Zeelaf (raga)
 Zeelaf (Asavari Thaat)
 Zeelaf (Bhairav aang)
 Zilla (raga)
 Zilla Kafi (raga)
 Zim Kalyan (created by Pt. Milind Date)

See also

 List of composers who created ragas
Carnatic raga
List of Janya ragas
List of Melakarta Ragas

References
 https://www.swarganga.org/raagabase.php
 https://www.surgyan.com/raag-collection

External links
 An Interactive list of 2000+ Ragas of Hindustani Classical Music 

 
 
 
 
Modes (music)